The Regions of Cameroon are divided into 58 divisions or departments. The divisions are further sub-divided into sub-divisions (arrondissements) and districts. The divisions are listed below, by province.

The constitution divides Cameroon into 10 semi-autonomous regions, each under the administration of an elected Regional Council. A presidential decree of 12 November 2008 officially instigated the change from provinces to regions. Each region is headed by a presidentially appointed governor. These leaders are charged with implementing the will of the president, reporting on the general mood and conditions of the regions, administering the civil service, keeping the peace, and overseeing the heads of the smaller administrative units. Governors have broad powers: they may order propaganda in their area and call in the army, gendarmes, and police. All local government officials are employees of the central government's Ministry of Territorial Administration, from which local governments also get most of their budgets.

The regions are subdivided into 58 divisions (departments). These are headed by presidentially appointed divisional officers, who perform the governors' duties on a smaller scale. The divisions are further sub-divided into sub-divisions, headed by assistant divisional officers. The districts, administered by district heads, are the smallest administrative units. These are found in large sub-divisions and in regions that are difficult to reach.

The three northernmost regions are the Far North, North, and Adamawa. Directly south of them are the Centre and East. The South Province lies on the Gulf of Guinea and the southern border. Cameroon's western region is split into four smaller regions: The Littoral and Southwest regions are on the coast, and the Northwest and West regions are in the western grassfields. The Northwest and Southwest were once part of British Cameroons; the other regions were in French Cameroun.

See summary of administrative history in Zeitlyn 2018.

North Cameroon Macro-Region

Adamawa (Adamaoua)

The Adamawa province of Cameroon contains the following five departments:

 Djérem
 Faro-et-Déo
 Mayo-Banyo
 Mbéré
 Vina

Far North (Extrême-Nord)

The Far North province of Cameroon contains the following six departments:

 Diamaré
 Logone-et-Chari
 Mayo-Danay
 Mayo-Kani
 Mayo-Sava
 Mayo-Tsanaga

North (Nord)

The North province of Cameroon contains the following four departments:

 Bénoué
 Faro
 Mayo-Louti
 Mayo-Rey

South Cameroon Macro-Region

Centre

The Centre province of Cameroon contains the following ten departments:

 Haute-Sanaga
 Lekié
 Mbam-et-Inoubou
 Mbam-et-Kim
 Méfou-et-Afamba
 Méfou-et-Akono
 Mfoundi
 Nyong-et-Kéllé
 Nyong-et-Mfoumou
 Nyong-et-So'o

East (Est)

The East province of Cameroon contains the following four departments:

 Boumba-et-Ngoko
 Haut-Nyong
 Kadey
 Lom-et-Djerem

South (Sud)

The South province of Cameroon contains the following four departments:

 Dja-et-Lobo
 Mvila
 Océan
 Vallée-du-Ntem

West Cameroon Macro-Region

Littoral

The Littoral province of Cameroon contains the following four departments:

 Moungo
 Nkam
 Sanaga-Maritime
 Wouri

Northwest (Nord-Ouest)

The Northwest province of Cameroon contains the following seven departments:

 Boyo
 Bui
 Donga-Mantung
 Menchum
 Mezam
 Momo
 Ngo-ketunjia

Southwest (Sud-Ouest)

The Southwest province of Cameroon contains the following six departments:

 Fako
 Koupé-Manengouba
 Lebialem
 Manyu
 Meme
 Ndian

West (Ouest)

The West province of Cameroon contains the following eight departments:

 Bamboutos
 Haut-Nkam
 Hauts-Plateaux
 Koung-Khi
 Menoua
 Mifi
 Ndé
 Noun

See also
 Communes of Cameroon
 Subdivisions of Cameroon
 List of municipalities of Cameroon

References

 
Subdivisions of Cameroon
Cameroon 2
Cameroon 2
Departments, Cameroon
Cameroon geography-related lists